Michael Crawford Kerr (March 15, 1827 – August 19, 1876) of Indiana was an attorney, an American legislator, and the first Democratic speaker of the United States House of Representatives after the Civil War.

Early life
He was born at Titusville, Pennsylvania and educated at the Erie Academy. He graduated from the University of Louisville School of Law in 1851. He moved to New Albany, Indiana in 1852 and was a member of the State Legislature from 1856 to 1857.

Political career
He was elected to Congress in 1864 as a War Democrat, having vigorously opposed the Copperhead element in his district. He won the praise of Republican Governor Morton for helping suppress illegal conspiracies by Copperheads.

Kerr served in the United States House of Representatives as a Democrat from Indiana from 1865 to 1873. In Congress he was looked upon as one of the leaders of the Democratic party. He strongly opposed the Republican policy of Reconstruction in the Southern States.  He was not re-elected in 1872.

His hard money views on financial questions did not meet with favor in his agrarian constituency, where he openly antagonized the inflationists and the Greenback element and favored the resumption of specie payments. In 1874, however, after a sharp contest he won the seat back, and on his re-entry into Congress was elected to the speakership. He presided as Speaker at only the first session of the Forty-fourth Congress and died of consumption shortly after its adjournment.

See also
List of United States Congress members who died in office (1790–1899)

Notes

Bibliography
 Halsell, Willie D., ed. "Advice from Michael C. Kerr to a Reconstructed Rebel Congressman." Indiana Magazine of History 33 (September 1941): 257-61.
 Smith, William Henry. The history of the state of Indiana  (1897) p. 798-800 online
Stampp, Kenneth. Indiana politics during the Civil War (1949)

External links
Original newspaper broadsheet in the collection of the State Archives in Indianapolis
 

1827 births
1876 deaths
People from Titusville, Pennsylvania
Speakers of the United States House of Representatives
People from New Albany, Indiana
Democratic Party members of the United States House of Representatives from Indiana
University of Louisville School of Law alumni
19th-century American politicians
19th-century deaths from tuberculosis
Tuberculosis deaths in Virginia